is a Japan-exclusive video game for the Super Famicom.

Gameplay
The game features huge super deformed characters with exaggerated animations and special moves. Three female fighters can be chosen in this game.

Plot 
They are embarking on a journey to defeat some evil forces trying to take over the world.

Reception 
Famitsu gave it a 22 out of 40 score.

Notes

References

External links 
 Battle Zeque Den at GameFAQs
 Battle Zeque Den at Giant Bomb

1994 video games
Asmik Ace Entertainment games
Beat 'em ups
Japan-exclusive video games
Side-scrolling video games
Super Nintendo Entertainment System games
Super Nintendo Entertainment System-only games
Video games developed in Japan
Video games featuring female protagonists